David James Good (born 18 December 1947) is a retired professional golfer from Australia. He had some success in the 1970s but is most noted for his record as a senior player. From 2000 he played regularly on the European Senior Tour, where he won twice and had nearly 50 top-10 finishes.

Professional career 
Good turned professional after the 1969 Australian Amateur at Royal Adelaide. He was the medalist after rounds of 71 and 70 but lost in the quarter-finals. Good travelled to Europe in 1973. He had limited success but qualified for the Open Championship at Troon and finished tied for 18th place. Later in the year, he came close to his first important win in the 1973 Garden City Classic in Christchurch, New Zealand. He had a 7-stroke lead after 3 rounds but had a final round of 77 and was beaten by John Lister who had a final round 67. Good shared second place with Bob Shearer. In 1974, he was affected by viral arthritis and spent some time out of golf.

Good won the Tasmanian Open in early 1976, winning a four-man playoff. He finished level with Stewart Ginn, Brian Jones and Ian Stanley. Ginn and Stanley were eliminated at the first extra hole and Good finally beat Jones at the fifth extra hole, making an eight-metre putt. In October, he came close to winning the South Coast Open. Leading after three rounds, he finished a stroke behind Barry Burgess and shared the runner-up place. At the end of the year, he was also runner-up in the Waikato Charity Classic in Hamilton, New Zealand, 7 shots behind John Lister.

In October 1977, Good won the New Zealand Airlines Open beating Bill Dunk, winning with a par at the first hole of a sudden-death playoff. The following week, he was runner-up in the CBA West Lakes Classic, five strokes behind Bob Shearer. At the end of the year, he played with Mike Cahill in the World Cup where they finished tied for 13th place.

In December 1999, Good played in the European Senior Tour qualifying school in Turkey. He finished 6th, to earn a place on the tour for 2000. He finished tied for 6th in his first event, the Beko Classic, had 6 other top-10 finishes during the year, and finished the season 25th in the Order of Merit. He had considerable success on the tour from 2001 to 2004 finishing 4th, 15th, 10th and 6th in the Order of Merit in those four seasons. In those four years, he won twice, the 2001 Legends in Golf and the 2003 Tunisian Seniors Open, was runner-up 6 times and had 27 other top-10 finishes, earning over €600,000. He continued playing on the tour from 2005 to 2009 but with less success, having a further 6 top-10 finishes in those five seasons. He also had considerable success as a senior in Australian events.

Professional wins (5)

PGA Tour of Australasia wins (3)

PGA Tour of Australasia playoff record (2–0)

European Senior Tour wins (2)

European Senior Tour playoff record (1–1)

Results in major championships

Note: Good only played in The Open Championship.

"T" = tied

Team appearances
Amateur
Australian Men's Interstate Teams Matches (representing Tasmania): 1966, 1967, 1968 (winners), 1969

Professional
World Cup (representing Australia): 1977

References

External links

 (as a senior)

Australian male golfers
PGA Tour of Australasia golfers
European Senior Tour golfers
People from Devonport, Tasmania
1947 births
Living people